QMR may refer to:
 QMR.fm, an internet radio station
 A Krylov subspace algorithm
 The QMR effect
 Queen's Medical Review, a student-run publication for Queen's School of Medicine students